The bare-throated whistler (Pachycephala nudigula) is a species of bird in the family Pachycephalidae. It is endemic to the Lesser Sundas.

Taxonomy and systematics
Alternate names for the bare-throated whistler include the Lesser Sunda whistler and Sunda whistler. The latter name is shared with the fawn-breasted whistler.

Subspecies 
Two subspecies are recognized:
 P. n. ilsa – Rensch, 1928: Sumbawa
 P. n. nudigula – Hartert, 1897: Flores

Habitat
Its natural habitats are subtropical or tropical dry forests, subtropical or tropical moist lowland forests, and subtropical or tropical moist montane forests.

References

bare-throated whistler
Birds of the Lesser Sunda Islands
Flores Island (Indonesia)
bare-throated whistler
Taxonomy articles created by Polbot